Robin Becker (born 1951) is an American poet, critic, feminist, and professor.  She was born in Philadelphia, Pennsylvania, and is author of seven collections of poetry, most recently, Tiger Heron and Domain of Perfect Affection (University of Pittsburgh Press, 2014 and 2006). Her  All-American Girl (University of Pittsburgh Press), won the 1996 Lambda Literary Award in Poetry. Becker earned a B.A. in 1973 and an M.A. from Boston University in 1976. She lives in Boalsburg, Pennsylvania and spends her summers in southern New Hampshire.

Teaching career
Becker taught for seventeen years at the Massachusetts Institute of Technology and currently and is Professor of English and Women's Studies at Pennsylvania State University,  where she has taught since 1993. She also teaches workshops such as those at the Summer Program Poetry Workshops at The Fine Arts Center in Provincetown, Massachusetts.

Literary influences and praise 
"Becker grew up listening to her grandmother's stories, learning from her the nuances of storytelling and her family's history in Ukraine. Becker was also greatly influenced by the women writers whose poetry was available in the 1970s, including Adrienne Rich, Audre Lorde, Maxine Kumin, Denise Levertov, and Susan Griffin. "

Her first two books were published by Alice James Books, the first in 1977, Personal Effects (a three-poet anthology,  including Robin Becker, Helena Minton and Marilyn Zuckerman), which makes her one of the earliest cooperative members of the press, which was founded in 1973, so it seems fitting that Ed Ochester has said that "Robin is one of the most varied of the poets on the Pitt list in her style and subject matter--and the foremost feminist poet of her generation."

In her biography of Robin Becker, Heidi Ogrodnek writes, "She is known for her work in Lesbian and Gay studies and served as visiting scholar at the Center for Lesbian and Gay studies at the CUNY in 1998. She has said, 'Feminist scholarship and Gay and Lesbian poetry have provided me with the tools with which to work.' Her collections of poetry develop precise, delicate imagery and… depict her own transition from girlhood to womanhood… Maxine Kumin has also been a tremendous inspiration to Becker...[she] learned that 'woman poets could celebrate their lives and not position themselves as victims in every story.' "

Her poems, essays, and book reviews have appeared in publications including Slate  The American Poetry Review, The Boston Globe, Gettysburg Review, AGNI, Ploughshares, Kenyon Review, Prairie Schooner, The New Yorker, and The Best American Poetry 2008. She has published book reviews in many venues, and writes a column on contemporary poetry called Field Notes for the Women's Review of Books, where she serves as Contributing and Poetry Editor. Her honors include fellowships from The Center for Lesbian and Gay Studies of the City University of New York, The William Steeple Davis Foundation, the Mary Bunting Institute of Radcliffe College, and the Massachusetts Artists Foundation.

Published works

Full-length collections

 The Black Bear Inside Me University of Pittsburgh Press, 2018. , 
 Tiger Heron, University of Pittsburgh Press, 2014. , 
 Domain of Perfect Affection, University of Pittsburgh Press, 2006. , 
 The Horse Fair University of Pittsburgh Press, 2000. , 
 All-American Girl (University of Pittsburgh Press, 1996)
 Giacometti's Dog University of Pittsburgh Press, 1990. , 
 Backtalk, Alice James Books, 1982. , 
 Personal Effects Alice James Books, 1977. , 

Chapbooks
  Venetian Blue, Frick Art Museum, 2002. ,

Awards
 1997: Virginia Faulkner Prize for Excellence in Writing from Prairie Schooner
 1996: Lambda Literary Award in Lesbian Poetry
 1989: National Endowment for the Arts - Literature Fellowship in Poetry

See also
 Lesbian Poetry

References

Sources
 The Academy of American Poets > Robin Becker
 PENN State > Pennsylvania Center for the Book > Robin Becker Biography > Prepared by Heidi Ogrodnek, Spring 2005
 PENN State Department of English > Faculty > Robin Becker 
 WGBH Forum Network: Meet the Poet: Robin Becker 
 The Poetry Center at Smith College > Robin Becker
 Library of Congress Online Catalog

External links
 Audio: Robin Becker Reading Her Poems 
 The Writer’s Almanac with Garrison Keillor > http://writersalmanac.publicradio.org/index.php?date=1997/06/03  Kindness  > By Robin Becker > June 3, 1997
 The Washington Post > Poet’s Choice > By Robert Pinsky > Sunday, July 16, 2006
 AGNI Online: The Elimination of First Thoughts > By Robin Becker 
 Smartish Pace > Review by Marianne Cotugno of Robin Becker’s Domain of Perfect Affection 
 Poetry Daily > Activist and Gardener: On Maxine Kumin's Torture Poems'' > A Review by Robin Becker
 The American Poetry Review > 'A Review by Robin Becker of David Ferry’s 'Translation of The Georgics of Virgil'' 
 University of Pittsburgh Press > Robin Becker > Domain of Perfect Affection Page 

1951 births
Living people
Poets from Pennsylvania
American women poets
Boston University alumni
Lambda Literary Award for Lesbian Poetry winners
American lesbian writers
National Endowment for the Arts Fellows
Pennsylvania State University faculty
Writers from Philadelphia
American LGBT poets
American women academics
21st-century American women writers